These place names containing the name "Tawachiche" means places or rivers, all located in the municipality of Lac-aux-Sables in Mauricie, in the province of Quebec, in Canada:

 Zec Tawachiche, a zone d'exploitation contrôlée (controlled harvesting zone), located in the upper watershed of the Tawachiche River and West Tawachiche 
 Tawachiche River, a tributary of the right bank of the Batiscan River 
 Tawachiche West River, a tributary of the right bank of the Tawachiche River 
 Chemin Tawachiche
 Chemin Tawachiche East, following the Tawachiche River (East section) from the mouth of the Tawachiche West River (the entrance station of the Zec Tawachiche) up towards the northeast
 Chemin Tawachiche west, starting at the visitor center of the Zec Tawachiche along the Tawachiche West River and Railway CN between Hervey-Jonction and La Tuque